Jibu is a Jukunoid language spoken in the Taraba State of Nigeria by 30,000 people.

Phonology 
In Jibu, there are 18 consonant phonemes, 9 vowels (which are represented just using three letters), and three tones (rising, mid-level, and falling). In Jibu, nasalization, labialization, and palatalization are considered to be part of the syllable, and are written along with it after the vowel. Nasalization is represented with n, except when it is at the end of a syllable it becomes doubled (/kʲã/ becomes kyann). Labialization is represented with w, and palatalization with y respectively.

Vowels 
In Jibu, there are 9 phonemically different vowels, which are represented by three different symbols. A tenth sound resembling /u/ (as in you), is only used in loanwords from other languages, such as the neighboring Hausa, and is represented by u.

Consonants 
Jibu has 18 different consonant phonemes. Some different phonemes are represented by the same symbol, such as /ʃ/ and /s/ being both represented as s in their older modified Americanist Phonetic Notation orthographic forms. If all of the consonant phonemes are represented using their older Americanist Phonetic Notation counterparts, there is no orthographic overlap. The sound /ɗ/, which is used in some Hausa loanwords, is commonly represented using 'd.

Tones 
Jibu has three tones (four if the base tone is included). These tones are high (´), lowered-mid (') and low (`). The base tone is not written on words and in more recent publications, neither is the lowered-mid tone.

Orthography 
The system used today in Jibu includes some symbols for transcribing sounds in Hausa loanwords, the older system, which is a slightly modified version of Americanist Phonetic Notation, does not include a symbol for the transcription of h, and includes the fact that multiple phonemes are transcribed as a single symbol in multiple cases.

Verbs 
In Jibu, verbs are not conjugated, which is a common aspect among Junkanoid languages. Instead, the pronoun is placed before the verb, and all aspect markers are placed before the pronoun.

Intransitive: á (work! - á sar)

Continuative action: ri (are working - ri sar)

Completed action: hiŋ (did work - hiŋ sar)

Completive action: rìg, rìghiŋ (work has been completed - rìg sar)

Pronouns 
Jibu pronouns do not reflect gender, the word wá meaning he, she, or it, unlike English, does not have multiple forms based on gender.

Phrases 
 Good afternoon - aku àyúnn-à
 Good morning - bib kyàr
 Sorry! - àtau!
 Hurry! - á àzwab!
 Hello, thank you - ísoko, soko

Literature

Biblical Texts

Psalm 100 
This text of the 100th psalm is presented in the standardized non-Americanist Phonetic Notation literary orthography.

References

Jukunoid languages
Languages of Nigeria